Carbonera may refer to:
 Carbonera, Veneto, Italy, a comune
 Carbonera (grape), an Italian wine grape
 Bar jack, a fish

See also 
 Carbonara (disambiguation)